Yeolmu or young summer radish is a type of leafy radish cultivated in Korea. Its taproots and greens are harvested when they are still soft and tender.

See also 
 Korean radish
 Chonggak radish
 Gegeol radish

References 

Asian radishes
Korean vegetables
Leaf vegetables
Root vegetables